Buckinghorse River is a river in  the province of British Columbia,.

In the area around the Buckinghorse River grows mainly pine forests. The neighborhood around the Buckinghorse River is almost uninhabited, with less than two inhabitants per square kilometre. The neighborhood is part of the boreal climate zones. .

References

Rivers of British Columbia